Suchart Chomklin is a Thai politician.  he serves as Minister of Labour in the second cabinet of Prime Minister Prayut Chan-o-cha.

Early life and education 
Suchart Chomklin was born on 15 July 1974, is the son of Wichian Chomklin. He lives in Muang District, Chonburi Province and graduated with a bachelor's degree in Bachelor of Management from Krirk University, he married Wimonchit Arintamapong and has 2 sons.

Political careers 
Suchart entered the political by becoming a member of the Chonburi Provincial Administrative Organization in Mueang Chonburi District before being elected as a member of the House of Representatives for the first time in 2011 under the Phalang Chon Party and the general election of members of the Thai House of Representatives, 2019, under the Palang Pracharath Party by being elected for a total of 2 consecutive terms.

On 6 August 2020, the royal command was graciously pleased to appoint him as the Minister of Labor under Prime Minister Prayut Chan-o-cha.

In 2022 Suchart join the Thai-Saudi relations restoration high-level meeting of Prime Minister Prayut. In the past, his father was a Thai worker who had traveled to Saudi Arabia for work before the conflict between Thailand and Saudi that stop Thai workers to work in Saudi Arabia in 1989. On this duty Suchart played an important role in the negotiations to restore relations to bring Thai workers back to work in Saudi Arabia again.

References 

Suchart Chomklin
Suchart Chomklin
Suchart Chomklin
Suchart Chomklin
Suchart Chomklin
Living people
1974 births
Suchart Chomklin